Austin Dias (born 20 May 1998) is a New Zealand rugby league footballer who plays as a  for the Manly-Warringah Sea Eagles in the National Rugby League.

He previously played for the Wests Tigers in the NRL.

Background
Dias played his junior rugby league for Taniwharau Rugby League Club

Dias is a committed Christian.

Career

2022
Dias made his first grade debut for the Wests Tigers against the New Zealand Warriors in round 16 of the 2022 NRL season. Wests would go on to lose the match 22-2.  Dias became Wests Tigers player no. 258.
Dias played a total of eight games for the Wests Tigers in the 2022 NRL season as the club finished bottom of the table and claimed the Wooden Spoon for the first time.
On 21 October, Dias signed a one-year contract to join Manly-Warringah ahead of the 2023 season.

References

External links
 Tigers profile

1998 births
Living people
New Zealand rugby league players
Wests Tigers players
Rugby league props